The sheepshead porgy (Calamus penna) is a species of fish of the porgy family, Sparidae, only found in the Atlantic Ocean. It is only distantly related to the California sheephead of the Pacific Ocean.

External links 

 

sheepshead porgy
Fish of the Western Atlantic
sheepshead porgy
Taxa named by Achille Valenciennes